Cédric Fabien (born 31 January 1982 in Cayenne, French Guiana) is a French Guianese former professional footballer played as a midfielder. He has represented the French Guiana national football team.

Career statistics

Honors
French Guiana
Caribbean Cup bronze: 2017

References

External links
 
 
 
 

1982 births
Living people
Sportspeople from Cayenne
French Guianan footballers
French Guiana international footballers
French footballers
Association football midfielders
Le Mans FC players
Tours FC players
Stade Brestois 29 players
Entente SSG players
US Boulogne players
Tarbes Pyrénées Football players
Ligue 2 players
Championnat National players
Championnat National 2 players
2017 CONCACAF Gold Cup players